Adrian Francis Powell (born 6 April 1941) is an Australian sprint canoeist who competed from the early 1960s to the mid-1970s. Competing in five Summer Olympics, he earned his best finish of eighth in the K-2 1000 m event at Tokyo in 1964.

He is the brother of Australian footballer John Powell.

References

External links
 
 
 

1941 births
Australian male canoeists
Canoeists at the 1960 Summer Olympics
Canoeists at the 1964 Summer Olympics
Canoeists at the 1968 Summer Olympics
Canoeists at the 1972 Summer Olympics
Canoeists at the 1976 Summer Olympics
Living people
Olympic canoeists of Australia
20th-century Australian people